In basketball, field-goal percentage is the ratio of field goals made to field goals attempted. The top 25 highest career percentages in National Collegiate Athletic Association (NCAA) Division I women's basketball history are listed below. While the NCAA's current three-division format has been in place since the 1973–74 season, it did not sponsor women's sports until the 1981–82 school year; before that time, women's college sports were governed by the Association of Intercollegiate Athletics for Women (AIAW).

To be listed in the Division I record book, a player must have been active in at least three D-I seasons during the era in which the NCAA governed women's sports if she played four seasons in all, or two D-I seasons in a three-season career. However, for those players who qualify for inclusion in the record book, AIAW statistics are included. To qualify for career leaderboards, a player must have made at least 400 field goals in her college career.

No listed players have been enshrined in the Naismith Memorial Basketball Hall of Fame, but Ruth Riley and Kara Wolters have been enshrined in the Women's Basketball Hall of Fame.

Among the career top 25, only two have played at more than one school. Celena Taborn split her college career between Furman and Butler, and Liz Sherwood split hers between UConn and Vanderbilt, Taborn and the currently active Monika Czinano of Iowa are the only players among the top 25 to have played in more than four college seasons. Both benefited from the NCAA's decision not to count the 2020–21 season, extensively impacted by COVID-19, against the eligibility of any basketball player.

Six programs have placed more than one player in the top 25. UConn has three in all, with Sherwood joined by all-time leader Tamika Williams and Wolters, who played their entire college careers at UConn. Five programs have two each: Georgia Southern (Regina Days and Trina Roberts), Iowa (Czinano and Megan Gustafson), Maryland (Crystal Langhorne and Brionna Jones), Tennessee Tech (Renay Adams and Roschelle Vaughn), and Vanderbilt (Chantelle Anderson and Sherwood).

Key

Top 25 career field-goal percentage leaders
Current through games of March 18, 2023.

Footnotes

References
General
 

Specific

Field goal percentage, career
Lists of college women's basketball players in the United States